Dry Fork is a stream in Gasconade and Maries counties in the U.S. state of Missouri. It is a tributary of the Bourbeuse River.

Dry Fork was named for its tendency to run dry.

See also
List of rivers of Missouri

References

Rivers of Gasconade County, Missouri
Rivers of Maries County, Missouri
Rivers of Missouri
Tributaries of the Meramec River